C. tomentosum  may refer to:
 Calophyllum tomentosum, the bintangur, a flowering plant species found only in Sri Lanka
 Cerastium tomentosum, the snow-in-summer, a flowering plant species
 Clerodendrum tomentosum, the downy chance, hairy lolly bush or hairy clerodendrum, a shrub or small tree species occurring in eastern and northern Australia

Synonyms
 Caryocar tomentosum, a synonym for Caryocar nuciferum, the butter-nut of Guiana or Pekea-nut, a fruit tree species native to northern Brazil, Colombia, Guianas, Peru and Venezuela

See also
 Tomentosum